Taksim means "division", "partition", or "distribution" in Turkish, Arabic, Persian and Urdu.

Taksim may also refer to:

Taksim (politics), the Turkish Cypriot political belief in the partition of Cyprus in the Cyprus dispute
Taksim Military Barracks, an artillery barracks in Istanbul that was built in 1806
Taksim Square, a square in Beyoğlu district of Istanbul, Turkey
Taksim Square massacre on 1 May 1977
Taksim (İstanbul Metro), an underground rapid transit complex under Taksim Square, Istanbul, Turkey
Taksim Stadium, a football stadium in Istanbul that was converted from Taksim Military Barracks in 1921
Taqsim, a style of musical improvisation in Balkan and Middle Eastern music